The 1952 United States Senate election in Rhode Island took place on November 4, 1952. Incumbent Democratic U.S. Senator John Pastore was re-elected to a second term in office.

Primary elections 
The Republican primary was held on September 15, 1952, and the Democratic primary was held on September 24, 1952.

Democratic primary

Candidate 
John Pastore, incumbent U.S. Senator

Results

Republican primary

Candidates 
Bayard Ewing, State Representative

Results

General election

Results

References

Bibliography
 
 

Rhode Island
1952
United States Senate